Karel Joseph Kaufman (20 April 1898 – 10 December 1977) was a Dutch football player and manager who managed Feyenoord in 1940, and the Netherlands national team in three separate spells, in 1946, 1949, and from 1954 to 1955.

As a player, Kaufman played for Achilles 1894 from 1916 to 1934.

References
 Drenthe Encyclopedia

1898 births
1977 deaths
Dutch footballers
Footballers from Amsterdam
Achilles 1894 players
Dutch football managers
Association footballers not categorized by position